Port au Port Bay located on the west coast of the Island of Newfoundland formed by a long narrow point of land of the Port au Port Peninsula and the area of Newfoundland known as the Lewis Hills, in the Canadian province of Newfoundland and Labrador.

The bay is further divided by a natural long point of land which forms two other bays, West Bay and East Bay. It is separated from Isthmus Bay to the south by two narrow gravel isthmi.

References

Bays of Newfoundland and Labrador